Events in the year 1793 in Norway.

Incumbents
Monarch: Christian VII

Events

Arts and literature

 Valle Church was built.

Births
2 May - David Vogt, politician (d.1861)

Full date unknown
Jens Lauritz Arup, politician (d.1874)
Ole Wilhelm Erichsen, politician and Minister (d.1860)
Ahlert Hysing, politician
Niels Andreas Thrap, politician (d.1856)

Deaths

See also